Achlydosa glandulosa is a species of orchid endemic to New Caledonia and the only species of the genus Achlydosa. This species has previously been placed in the genus Megastylis. Its closest relative is Pterostylis, the sole other genus of subtribe Pterostylidinae.

References

Endemic flora of New Caledonia
Orchids of New Caledonia
Monotypic Orchidoideae genera
Pterostylidinae
Cranichideae genera